Cecil Arthur Lynch Payne (30 August 1885 – 21 March 1976) was an English first-class cricketer who played irregularly for Middlesex from 1905 to 1909. He was born in Dacca, educated at Charterhouse School and New College, Oxford, and died in Vancouver.

On his first-class debut, playing for Marylebone Cricket Club (MCC) against Derbyshire in July 1905, he scored 101 in 110 minutes batting at number three. He went to Canada shortly after his first-class career finished, and was Canadian Amateur Billiards Champion in 1927 and 1928.

References

External links

1885 births
1976 deaths
People educated at Charterhouse School
English cricketers
Middlesex cricketers
Marylebone Cricket Club cricketers
Oxford University cricketers
Alumni of New College, Oxford
Cricketers from Dhaka